The Scout and Guide movement in Fiji is served by
 Fiji Girl Guides Association, member of the World Association of Girl Guides and Girl Scouts
 Fiji Scouts Association, member of the World Organization of the Scout Movement

See also